George Finegan (31 March 1935 – 19 December 2016) was an Australian rules footballer who played for Geelong in the Victorian Football League (now known as the Australian Football League).

References

External links
 
 

1935 births
Geelong Football Club players
Sale Football Club players
Australian rules footballers from Victoria (Australia)

2016 deaths